White Lightning may refer to:

Music
 White Lightning (band), an American psychedelic rock band
 "White Lightning" (Def Leppard song), 1992
 "White Lightning" (The Big Bopper song), 1959
 White Lightnin' (duo), fiddler Byard Ray and banjoist Obray Ramsey

Film
 White Lightnin', a 2009 film
 White Lightning (1953 film), a 1953 film directed by Edward Bernds
 White Lightning (1973 film), a 1973 film starring Burt Reynolds

Other uses
 White Lightning (cider), the brand name of a cheap, strong, white cider once sold in the United Kingdom
 White Lightning (car), an electric car
 White Lightning (roller coaster), a wooden roller coaster at Fun Spot America in Kissimmee, Florida, United States
 White Lightning WLAC-1, an American kitplane design
 Allan Donald (born 1966), South African cricketer nicknamed "White Lightning"
 A slang term for moonshine
 The name given to a batch of white LSD tablets produced by Owsley Stanley